Greyhound adoption or Greyhound rescue programs focus on finding homes for Greyhounds who are no longer needed for racing. In some countries they live in kennels at the track.

Currently, most Greyhound adoption programs are based in the United Kingdom, Canada, Australia, New Zealand and the United States.  In Europe groups deal with dogs from a variety of sources; for example, in Spain, ex-hunting dogs are often in need of rescuing along with Greyhounds.

Origins and work of the greyhound-adoption movement
The Greyhound adoption movement grew out of a concern by a diverse community of people about the welfare among dogs in the commercial racing industry.

Greyhound adoption was started by the greyhound industry in the late 1970s.  Greyhound Pets of America (GPA) was established in 1987 for the purpose of finding homes for ex-racing greyhounds, and educating the public on the suitability and availability of greyhounds as pets.  GPA is the largest non-profit greyhound adoption group.  Since its creation GPA has adopted out over 80,000 greyhounds.  In 1989 David Wolf founded the National Greyhound Adoption Program (NGAP) mostly with his own resources.  He has become the most controversial figure in the greyhound adoption community, and is one of the most outspoken critics of the greyhound racing industry.  The Greyhound Project maintains a directory of hundreds of greyhound adoption agencies throughout the world.

Over time as the number of adoption groups has grown, a deep ideological division regarding Greyhound racing has developed.  Some groups are generally opposed to any form of Greyhound racing for any purpose. Others are officially racing neutral, meaning they neither oppose nor endorse dog racing.

Historically Greyhounds have had a reputation for being gentle, people-centered dogs, and "par-excellence for persons wishing for a companion for themselves or their children". When Greyhound adoption first started in the United States, many people associated with racing argued that Greyhounds did not make suitable pets.  However, as the number of greyhounds successfully transitioning from tracks to households has risen, many people have come to believe that greyhounds are good companions. They describe Greyhounds as gentle and affectionate dogs who adapt easily to household life because they have clean, short coats and require only moderate exercise.

Care

Medical care
Some Greyhounds may require medical and hygiene care when they first come to adoption groups, however this is not usually the case.

Occasionally the Greyhound may require.

 Dental cleaning
 Worming (Usually done by the Greyhound trainer every 3 months)
 Vaccinations (Usually done annually by the Greyhound trainer)
 Bathing
 Clipping nails

Living conditions
Greyhounds living with adoption groups generally receive one of two types of care: pet boarding kennels or foster homes.  Several adoption groups use pet boarding kennels, which are similar to those used by the tracks in the United States.  These kennels generally allow large spaces for each dog; the dogs also receive time in outdoor runs. Other groups feel that the best way to prepare the dogs for living in homes is to provide them with a foster home. The owner of the retiring Greyhound generally pays for the medical care and food for the dogs while in their care,  allowing the foster "family" to train the dog and provide for their day-to-day needs.

There is some debate within the adoption community about which technique is better. The trade off is essentially quality of living situation vs. number of animals helped. It is generally accepted that by keeping former racers in pet boarding kennels, the group can help a larger number of dogs more effectively, while groups that have a foster program can provide a better living situation for the dog more quickly.

Behavior of adopted greyhounds

Like any dog, greyhounds vary widely in their temperament, behavior, levels of activity, and in virtually all other aspects of their personality. As they are accustomed to a particular regimented environment at the track, they may adapt to life in a human home slowly, gradually overcoming fears of new sounds and experiences.  Greyhounds may not immediately understand windows and glass doors, attempting to move through them, and may require an introduction to staircases and slippery floor surfaces.

Although usually well-socialized with other greyhounds, ex-racers often have limited skills for living outside of the racing kennel. However, most Greyhounds are quick learners. They tend to be out-going, happy and sociable with people and seem to relish human contact, even following owners from room to room at home (known colloquially as being a "Velcro dog"). Some Greyhounds are more timid and can for a time have difficulty coping with new people or situations. A period of rehabilitation and a dedicated owner usually helps nervous "Retired Racers" become more confident. A few people also report that they have known "Greys" who at first fear other dog breeds until sufficiently exposed. As the lure used to train greyhounds for racing resembles a hare, retired racers sometimes also mistake smaller dogs for a lure, causing them to set chase. Similarly, small animals including cats may also be the subject of prey-driven behavior by some greyhounds. Prior to adoption, agencies generally screen greyhounds for their suitability around small animals especially by way of "cat testing" in which a dog is carefully exposed to a cat to see his or her interest level.

Some Greyhounds have a strong prey drive, having been bred to hunt and chase. For a few Greyhounds this urge can be difficult or impossible to overcome through training. Frequently, Greyhound adoption agencies require owners to keep them on-leash at all times, except in fully enclosed areas. A few agencies will also advise owners to keep their greyhounds muzzled around other dogs with which they are not familiar. While some owners disagree or ignore this advice, adoption groups like those linked here are generally very clear about this requirement. For the best interests of the breed in general they encourage owners to be cautious with Greyhounds because on the track they are trained to run and chase regardless of weather or injury or individual desire, while at the same time breeders select dogs with a strong prey drive for breeding.

Greyhounds have very thin skin and very short fur. They can be easily harmed by biting or scratching from other dogs or accidentally running into sharp objects. Combined with their low body fat, coats or sweaters are required when outside in cold weather. Some owners also put boots on their Greyhounds in very cold temperatures.

In the home, the vast majority of greyhounds are easily trained for housebreaking. Some suspect Greyhounds consider the house to be an extension of their crate, and thus will not voluntarily urinate or defecate indoors except in exigent circumstances, such as severe intestinal upset.

Greyhounds enjoy resting on beds and sofas, often sleeping or dozing 16 hours a day or more. They often "dig up" their bedding materials like blankets to create a pile that can cushion their deep rib cage, which can make it difficult for them to get comfortable. Particularly common in sleeping among Greyhounds is the so-called "roach" or "cockroach" sleeping position, in which a Greyhound will roll onto his/her back and spread his/her legs at odd angles in all directions, in a position reminiscent of deceased cockroaches who are often found on their backs.

Greyhound adopter and public education events are found wherever ex-racers are re-homed. Some are small local gatherings hosted by adoption groups; others are regional events drawing participants (dog and human) from great distances. It is common to find Greyhound outreach at local pet stores and other public events in which members of the community can see "retired racers" and speak to adoption group volunteers. The largest event for retired Greyhound owners is the Greyhounds Reach the Beach, which takes place in Dewey Beach, Delaware in the United States.  Two to four thousand dogs and their human escorts generally attend this event.

See also

Dog adoption
Greyhound racing
Greyhound

References

External links
The Greyhound Project's Worldwide Greyhound Adoption Agency Directory

Dogs as pets
Greyhound racing
Dog organizations
Animal welfare in greyhound racing